Klosters Selfranga railway station is a railway station in the municipality of Klosters, in the Swiss canton of Grisons. It is located on the  gauge Vereina line of the Rhaetian Railway, just short of the  Vereina Tunnel.

Services
The following services stop at Klosters Selfranga:

References

External links
 
 Car transporter – Rhaetian Railway

Klosters-Serneus
Railway stations in Graubünden
Rhaetian Railway stations
Railway stations in Switzerland opened in 1999